Leptobrachella mjobergi (sometimes known as the Mount Gadin Borneo frog or Mjöberg's dwarf litter frog)  is a species of frogs in the family Megophryidae. It is endemic to Borneo where it is found in Kalimantan (Indonesia), Brunei, and Sarawak (Malaysia).

Description
They are brown above with dark markings between eyes, on the shoulder, and thighs. The supratympanic fold is not distinct in colouration. The flanks have white glands that can fuse to form a longitudinal ridge. Tips of toes and fingers are pointed. Foot webbing is absent.

Tadpoles
The tadpoles of Leptobrachella mjobergi are relatively small (total length up to ) and have a vermiform or eel-like appearance. The transition from the narrow, cylindrical trunk into the strong tail is nearly seamless, and the tail fin is very low. They have unusually mobile head and trunk. While smaller tadpoles seem to use existing interstitial spaces, larger ones can actively push their way through gravel. They seem to be restricted to gravel habitats in small streams.

Habitat and conservation
Its natural habitats are lowland rainforests. Adults are found on the forest floor, but move to clear, rocky streams to breed. It is threatened by habitat loss (deforestation, and siltation of streams).

References

External links
 Sound recordings of Leptobrachella mjobergi at BioAcoustica

mjobergi
Amphibians of Brunei
Amphibians of Indonesia
Amphibians of Malaysia
Endemic fauna of Borneo
Amphibians described in 1925
Taxa named by Malcolm Arthur Smith
Taxonomy articles created by Polbot
Amphibians of Borneo